Pseudogerespa is a genus of moths of the order Erebidae. The genus was erected by George Hampson in 1926.

Species
Pseudogerespa adjutus (Dognin, 1912) Colombia
Pseudogerespa diopis Hampson, 1926 Colombia
Pseudogerespa fannius (Dognin, 1912) Ecuador
Pseudogerespa niviferus (Dognin, 1912) Colombia
Pseudogerespa usipetes (Druce, 1898) Mexico, Costa Rica

References

Calpinae